Testudinoidea is a superfamily within the suborder Cryptodira of the order Testudines. It includes the pond turtles (Family: Emydidae), Asian turtles (Family: Geoemydidae), the monotypic big-headed turtle (Family: Platysternidae), and the tortoises (Family: Testudinidae).

Systematics
A 2021 study found the clade to be divided into two extant groups: Testuguria, containing Geoemydidae and Testudinidae; and Emysternia, containing Emydidae and Platysternidae. The extinct Lindholmemydidae, formerly classified in Testudinoidea, may fall outside the crown group of Testudinoidea, although there is not yet enough evidence for this.
 Pantestudinoidea
Lindholmemydidae?
Testudinoidea
Wutuchelys
 Haichemydidae
 Sinochelyidae
 Testuguria
 Geoemydidae
 Testudinidae
 Emysternia
 Emydidae
 Platysternidae

References

Bibliography